Mo Tse ( also known as Miu Tse, Tse Miu, Tze Miu, Xia Miao, Xie Miao) is an actor who began as a child actor. He is known for his roles in China action cinema. He has starred as a father-son duo with Jet Li in the 1994 film The New Legend of Shaolin. He was also in The Champions, which was the opening film at the 2008 Chinese American Film Festival.

In 2006, he graduated from Capital Institute of Physical Education (CIPE).

Filmography

Television

References

External links
  
 
 
 
 
 http://movie.douban.com/celebrity/1314627/ 
 http://people.mtime.com/1013759/ 

1984 births
Male actors from Beijing
Living people
Hong Kong male film actors
Hong Kong male television actors
20th-century Chinese male actors
21st-century Chinese male actors
Chinese male film actors
Chinese male television actors
20th-century Hong Kong male actors
21st-century Hong Kong male actors